During the 1992–93 English football season, Peterborough United F.C. competed in the Football League First Division.

Season summary

Final league table

Results
Peterborough United's score comes first

Legend

Football League First Division

FA Cup

League Cup

Anglo-Italian Cup

Squad

References

Peterborough United F.C. seasons
Peterborough United